Frankfurter Büro Center (German for Frankfurt Office Centre), also known as FBC, is a 40-storey,  skyscraper in the Westend-Süd district of Frankfurt, Germany. It was designed by architect Richard Heil from Frankfurt. The building's anchor tenant is the international law firm Clifford Chance.

Background
Due to the oil crisis the construction of the skyscraper got stuck in 1975. Until 1979 no investor had been found to finish the building because of high construction costs and a lack of prospective tenants for the office space. Later the ECE project development company stepped in and reached an agreement with owners and artisans, and developed a construction program for completion and technical improvement as well as a rental concept. Thus, the occupancy rate was approximately 65 percent.

The building was owned by DEGI, an open property fund of Dresdner Bank from 1985 to 2007 and then sold to the Goldman Sachs Whitehall Fund. In 2016 it was acquired by PBM Germany, a construction company from Berlin.

See also
 List of tallest buildings in Frankfurt
 List of tallest buildings in Germany
 List of tallest buildings in the European Union

References

Office buildings completed in 1981
Skyscrapers in Frankfurt
Skyscraper office buildings in Germany